Whampoa Garden is the largest private housing estate in Hung Hom, Kowloon, Hong Kong. It was built on the site of the former Whampoa Dockyards by Hutchison Whampoa Property. The urban design of the estate incorporates concepts inspired by the Garden city movement and was completed in 1991.

Features

The estate covers 19 hectares and consists of 12 complexes. Ten are residential/commercial mixed use, with a total of 88 16-storey residential high-rise towers. The other two are solely commercial use. There was a height restriction on the buildings due to its proximity to the Kai Tak Airport at the time. It includes eight shopping arcades, three supermarkets, a cinema, hundreds of restaurants and shops, a karaoke, five primary schools, mini-parks and two public transport interchange. Most notable shops include Sushiro, AEON (Japanese department store), Sukiya, Wonderland Superstore.

The Whampoa, a -long boat-shaped shopping centre built in the original No. 1 Dry Dock, is located in Phase 6. During the 1980s and 1990s, the structure housed a playground on the top and "deck" level, seafood restaurants, a cinema on other floors above ground levels; the department store Yaohan on ground and basement level, and an indoor family theme park (開心一號) with an arcade game centre and a roller skating rink on lower basement level. In late 1990s, the department store was taken over by JUSCO department store. The JUSCO department store was renamed to AEON in 2013, to be consistent with the name change adopted by its parent company in Japan. In May 2016, the department store was renovated and renamed as AEON Style after its reopening in September the same year.

There is also a promenade along sea side, from Laguna Verde to Hung Hom Ferry Pier. It is also linked to the Avenue of Stars. One can walk from Hung Hom Pier to Tsim Sha Tsui Pier in about 40 minutes.

Complexes

Demographic
According to the 2016 by-census, Whampoa Gardens had a population of 30,198. The median age was 41.8. Nearly 88 per cent of the estate was of Chinese ethnicity. Cantonese speakers comprised 87 per cent of the speaking population, with English as the second-most usual spoken language, at 7 per cent.

Transportation
MTR
Whampoa Garden is served by Whampoa station, the terminus of the Kwun Tong line. The underground station, located beneath Tak On Street, opened on 23 October 2016.

Ferry
 Hung Hom to North Point
 Hung Hom to Central

Education
Whampoa Garden and Whampoa Estate are in Primary One Admission (POA) School Net 35. Within the school net are multiple aided schools (operated independently but funded with government money) and Ma Tau Chung Government Primary
School (Hung Hom Bay) (馬頭涌官立小學（紅磡灣）).

References

External links 

 Emporis: Whampoa Garden
 Location of Whampoa Garden
 S.K. Hui, A. Cheung, J. Pang, "A Hierarchical Bayesian Approach for Residential Property Valuation:Application to Hong Kong Housing Market" (Archive), International Real Estate Review, 2010 Vol. 13 No.1: pp. 1 – 29
 Yu, Pui-kwan Robin (C: 余沛琨, J: jyu4 pui3 gwan1, P: Yú Pèikūn), "A study on quasi-public space in large scale private residential development, case in Hong Kong", University of Hong Kong, 2007 (Archive)

Hung Hom
Private housing estates in Hong Kong
CK Hutchison Holdings